Ŝtephen Sečka (6 July 1953 – 28 October 2020) was a Slovak Roman Catholic bishop.

Sečka was born in Czechoslovakia and was ordained to the priesthood in 1976. He served as auxiliary bishop of Sita and auxiliary bishop of the Roman Catholic Diocese of Spiš, Slovakia, from 2002 to 2011 and was bishop of the diocese from 2011 until his death in 2020.

Sečka died on 28 October 2020 from cardiac arrest at the age of 67.

Notes

1953 births
2020 deaths
21st-century Roman Catholic bishops in Slovakia
People from Levoča District